Kozhinjampara is a town in the Palakkad district, state of Kerala, India alongside the borderline of Tamil Nadu. It forms a part of the area administered by the Kozhinjampara gram panchayat.

Demographics 
 Indian census, Kozhinjampara village had a population of 12,311 with 6,042 males and 6,269 females. Total number of households in village limit is 2,919. Kozhinjampara village has lower literacy rate compared to Kerala. In 2011, literacy rate of Kozhinjampara village was 84.17% compared to 94.00% of Kerala. In Kozhinjampara Male literacy stands at 90.47% while female literacy rate was 78.12%.

Ravuthar biriyani is a traditional food available in Kozhinjampara

Education
 Government Arts and Science College, Kozhinjanpara

References 

Villages in Palakkad district